Pochon is a surname. Notable people with the surname include:

 Alfred Pochon (1878–1959), Swiss musician
 André Pochon (born 1931), French farmer
 Élisabeth Pochon (born 1955), French politician
 Hans Pochon (1900–1977), Swiss entomologist